The Guanyin Bridge is a stone arch bridge located on the southern Mount Lu, in Lushan, Jiangxi, China. It was built in 1014 during the reign of Emperor Zhenzong of the Song dynasty (960–1279). It is one of the earliest existing stone arch bridges in China.

History
The bridge was built as "Qianxian Bridge" in 1014, during the Song dynasty (960–1279). In history, Su Shi, Su Zhe, Huang Tingjian, Yang Wanli, Wang Shipeng, Zhu Xi, Wen Tianxiang, Ouyang Xuan, and Tang Yin wrote poems and articles singing about the bridge. In the Qing dynasty (1644–1911), a Buddhist temple named "Cihang Temple" was built in front of the bridge. "Cihang" means "Guanyin". Therefore, the bridge was called "Guanyin Bridge".     

Guanyin Bridge was inscribed as a provincial cultural relics protection unit in 1959 and was listed among the "Major National Historical and Cultural Sites in Jiangxi" by the State Council of China.

Architecture
It was made of 107 pieces of granite. The construction time of the bridge is engraved on the deck.

References

Bibliography
 
 
 

Bridges in Jiangxi
Arch bridges in China
Bridges completed in the 11th century
Song dynasty architecture
Buildings and structures completed in 1014
Major National Historical and Cultural Sites in Jiangxi
1014 establishments in Asia
11th-century establishments in China